The Longdendale Trail is an English long-distance rail trail following the former Woodhead railway line, which ran between Manchester and Sheffield and closed east of Hadfield in 1981. It has shallow gradients and a smooth surface that makes it popular with families and cyclists.

The trail, which opened in May 1992, forms part of the longer Trans Pennine Trail, NCR 62, that runs from coast to coast across the UK (Liverpool to Hull).

See also
 Rail trail

External links

Footpaths in Derbyshire
Tourist attractions of the Peak District
Rail trails in England
Long-distance footpaths in England